The 2009 Silver Helmet (BK) is the 2009 version of Bronze Helmet organized by the Polish Motor Union (PZM). The Final took place on 11 September in Wrocław and was won by Maciej Janowski (Atlas Wrocław). Janowski beat Patryk Dudek (Falubaz Zielona Góra) and Łukasz Sówka (KM Lazur Ostrów Wlkp.).

Semi-final

Bydgoszcz 
 Semi-Final 1
 20 August 2009
 Bydgoszcz
 Referee: Leszek Demski
 Change:
No. 9 Mateusz Łukowiak (ZIE) → Kamil Adamczewski (LES)
No. 14 Piotr Machnik (KRO) → (17) Marcin Bubel (CZE)
No. 16 Paweł Machnik (KRO) → (18) Adrian Osmólski (CZE)
No. 19 Edward Mazur (TAR) → None

Heat 21: Adamczewski (Gate A), Curyło (B)

Poznań 
 Semi-Final 2
 20 August 2009
 Poznań
 Referee: Ryszard Bryła
 Best time: 66.82 - Przemysław Pawlicki in Heat 4
 Change:
No. 6 Mateusz Lampkowski (TOR) → Tomasz Wolniewicz (OPO)
No. 16 Piotr Szóstak (OST) → Łukasz Piecha (RYB)
No. 17 Tobiasz Musielak (LES) → None

The Final 

 11 September 2009 (19:00 UTC+2)
 Wrocław
 Referee: Marek Smyła
 Best time: 65.6 - Patryk Dudek in Heat 3
Change:
(5) injury Przemysław Pawlicki (LES) → Reserve 18

See also 

 2009 Individual Speedway Junior Polish Championship

References 

2009
Helmet Bronze